Domenico Botticella (born 2 March 1976 in San Giovanni Rotondo) is an Italian  football coach and former player, who used to play as a goalkeeper. He is the current goalkeeping coach of Casertana.

Playing career
Botticella played in Serie B with Salernitana between 2000 and 2005. In his last season, he competed for a starting spot with Marco Ambrosio and Alex Brunner.

He also played for Foggia in Serie C1 and Serie C2.

Before joining Paganese, he played for Manfredonia of Serie C1 and Catanzaro of Serie C2.

On 28 July 2011, he joined Foggia on a free transfer after being released by Cavese.

In 2013 Botticella joined Apulian Prima Categoria amateur club Canosa.

Coaching career
After retirement, Botticella embarked on a career as a goalkeeping coach, working alongside his former boss Delio Rossi in a number of clubs such as Levski Sofia, Palermo and Ascoli.

On 29 December 2022, he was hired as the new goalkeeping coach of Serie D club Casertana following the appointment of Vincenzo Cangelosi, former Zdeněk Zeman right-hand man, as new head coach.

References

External links
 Profile at paganese
FootballPlus Profile

1976 births
Living people
People from San Giovanni Rotondo
Italian footballers
Calcio Foggia 1920 players
S.S. Chieti Calcio players
U.S. Salernitana 1919 players
Association football goalkeepers
Footballers from Apulia
Sportspeople from the Province of Foggia